Dr. Seymour C.Y. Cheng (1902-1954) was an American diplomat of Chinese heritage.

Career 
Cheng received Ph.D. from Columbia University in 1931. He worked in the Ministry of Foreign Affairs most of his career. His last assignment was Counselor of the Chinese Embassy in London. Dr. Cheng held this position until 1950.

References 

American diplomats
1902 births
1954 deaths
Columbia University alumni
American people of Chinese descent